Rock Machine is a International Outlaw Motorcycle Club from Quebec, Canada.

Rock Machine may also refer to:
 Rock Machine, the former name of Indus Creed, an Indian rock band
 Rock Machine Records, the French electronic music label
 Rok Mašina (English: Rock Machine), a former Yugoslav hard rock band

See also
 The Rock Machine Turns You On (sampler)
 Rock Machine I Love You